Muhammad Youssef Al-Najjar (11 June 1930 – 10 April 1973), commonly known as Abu Youssef, was a Palestinian militant who was assassinated by Israel over alleged involvement in the 1972 Munich massacre.

Life
Originally from Yibna, he was forced to leave his home village in 1948  by the Israeli forces when he settled with his family in the Rafah Camp, Gaza Strip. He worked as a teacher until 1954 when he went to Egypt to study law at Cairo University. He was qualified from Egypt as a lawyer. When the Fatah organization formed in the late 1950s, Youssef was an early activist, traveling to Qatar to form similar groups, and taking command of Fatah's military wing.

In 1968, Youssef was appointed to the Executive Committee of the Palestine Liberation Organization (PLO). He also was a member of the Palestinian National Congress, and the Palestinian parliament in exile. Two months before his death, Youssef was interviewed by the Beirut newspaper L'Orient-Le Jour. In the interview, he explained his conviction to the Palestinian cause, saying that he did not expect his generation of Palestinians to defeat Israel but that future generations would continue fighting: "We plant the seeds, and the others will reap the harvest. Most probably we'll all die, killed because we are confronting a fierce enemy. But the youth will replace us".

Youssef was allegedly involved in planning the 1972 Munich massacre, in which 11 Israeli athletes and coaches were killed by the Black September group. This prompted Israel to launch a revenge campaign called Operation Wrath of God, with Youssef as a principal target. In 1973, Israel sent commandos to Beirut, Lebanon to assassinate three high-ranking PLO officials, among then Youssef, in the 1973 Israeli raid on Lebanon. Youssef and his wife were killed by gunfire when Israeli commandos stormed their Beirut apartment.

Legacy
The Mohammed Yousef El-Najar Hospital in Rafah was named after him.

His grandson, Ammar Campa-Najjar, ran in 2018 as a Democrat to represent California's 50th congressional district in the United States House of Representatives, losing to the incumbent Republican Duncan Hunter. Campa-Najjar ran again in 2020, but lost to former congressman Darrell Issa.

See also
 List of Israeli assassinations

References

1930 births
1973 deaths
Assassinated military personnel
Assassinated Palestinian people
Deaths by firearm in Lebanon
Fatah military commanders
Members of the Black September Organization
Operation Wrath of God
Palestinian Muslims
People from Beirut
People killed in Mossad operations
Ibrahimieh College alumni
Central Committee of Fatah members